María Teresa Fernández de la Vega Sanz (born 15 June 1949) is a Spanish politician and magistrate of the Socialist Party. During her political career, she served as first deputy prime minister, minister of the Presidency and government spokesperson under prime minister José Luis Rodríguez Zapatero from 2004 to 2010 and as president of the Council of State from 2018 to 2022, being the first first female deputy prime minister and the first female president of the advisory council.

Early life and career
Fernández de la Vega is the daughter of Wenceslao Fernández de la Vega Lombán who was a public servant during Franco's dictatorship, a delegate of the ministry of employment headed at that time by Fermín Sanz Orrio (1957–1962). She was born in Valencia in 1949. She earned a degree in law from the Complutense University of Madrid in the early 1970s. In 1974 she entered Spain's Cuerpo de Secretarios Jurídicos Laborales, a specialised body of the civil service.

Political career
Fernández de la Vega started her political career in the Unified Socialist Party of Catalonia, remaining a member of it until 1979. From 1982 until 1985, she was the director of the advisory cabinet of the minister of justice, and in 1985 she was appointed general director of services at the ministry of justice. In 1986 she became a member of the legal cooperation committee of the Council of Europe. In 1990, she was chosen as a spokesperson of the general council of judicial power by the Senate (1994–1996). On 13 May 1994, the then Justice Minister Juan Alberto Belloch appointed her as the 1st Secretary of State for Justice.

Fernández de la Vega was elected a member of the Spanish Congress for Jaén for the Spanish Socialist Workers' Party candidacy for the 1996–2000 term, being re-elected in the elections of 2000 for Segovia. During this term she became general secretary of the Socialist parliamentary group.

In the Spanish general election of 2004 she became a member of the parliament for Madrid, and on 18 April of that year she was appointed first vice president and minister of Presidency, remaining the incumbent of each.

Fernández de la Vega was the first woman to take on the functions of the prime minister in the history of Spanish democracy, when, on 24 April 2004, during the first official visit abroad of Spain's Prime Minister, Zapatero, she presided over the Council of Ministers.

In March 2006, the first vice president went on an African tour with the state secretary for cooperation, Leire Pajín, visiting Kenya and Mozambique, in whose capital, Maputo, they celebrated International Women's Day and closed the forum "Spain-Africa: Women for a better world".

For the 2008 elections, Fernández de la Vega headed the list for the PSOE in Valencia. She left all the political offices in October 2010.

President of the Council of State 
After leaving the first political line, on July 3, 2018, prime minister Pedro Sánchez chose her to chair over the Council of State, the supreme consultative council of the Spanish government. She assumed the office on July 5, 2018, becoming the first woman to chair the Council.

Other activities
 Judges for Democracy (Jueces para la Democracia), Member
 Graduate School for Global and International Studies, University of Salamanca, Member of the Advisory Board

In addition, Fernández de la Vega has written many papers, including La reforma de la jurisdicción laboral and Derechos humanos y Consejo de Europa.

Recognition
 On 7 October 2006 Fernández de la Vega received the Tomás y Valiente Award in Fuenlabrada, Madrid.
 On 6 November 2010 Fernández de la Vega was granted with the Grand Cross of the Order of Charles III.

See also
 Council of Ministers of Spain (8th Legislature)

References

External links
Website of the Ministry of Presidency of Spain

1949 births
Living people
People from Valencia
Complutense University of Madrid alumni
Politicians from the Valencian Community
Spanish Socialist Workers' Party politicians
Members of the 6th Congress of Deputies (Spain)
Members of the 7th Congress of Deputies (Spain)
Members of the 8th Congress of Deputies (Spain)
Members of the 9th Congress of Deputies (Spain)
Government ministers of Spain
Women government ministers of Spain
Deputy Prime Ministers of Spain
Recipients of the Order of the Cross of Terra Mariana, 1st Class
21st-century Spanish women politicians
Members of the General Council of the Judiciary
Secretaries of State of Spain
20th-century Spanish women